Conqueror is the second full-length album from Jesu. It was released on 20 February 2007 in the USA, 19 February in the United Kingdom and Europe, and 2 February in Japan.

The Japanese edition contains a bonus disc featuring the two tracks that constitute the Sun Down / Sun Rise EP.

This album features much more melody and less drone than the self-titled album.

In support of the album, the band made their United States live debut, in March 2007, as an opening act for Isis, although work permit problems caused them to miss the first three weeks of the tour.

Track listing

Personnel
 Justin Broadrick - guitars, vocals, programming
 Diarmuid Dalton - bass
 Ted Parsons - drums, percussion

References

External links
kvltsite.com review

Jesu (band) albums
2007 albums
Hydra Head Records albums
Albums with cover art by Aaron Turner